Coldwater is an Indian reserve community on the Coldwater River in the Nicola Country region of the British Columbia Interior in the Canadian province of British Columbia, located six miles southwest of the City of Merritt.  It is the main reserve of the Coldwater First Nation, the government of the local group of Nlaka'pamux people and was the site of the Coldwater Mission, one of the first Catholic missions in the Interior of the province.  It was at Coldwater that the Duployan shorthand used in the Kamloops Wawa periodical published by the Kamloops diocese was first learned and taught.

See also
List of Indian reserves in British Columbia
List of communities in British Columbia

References

External links
Map and photos from the Coldwater First Nation homepage

Nicola Country
Nlaka'pamux
Unincorporated settlements in British Columbia